Hellinsia pelospilus is a moth of the family Pterophoridae that can be found in Peru and Ecuador.

The wingspan is 23‑25 mm. The forewings are creamy‑white and the markings are dark brown, consisting of a faint longitudinal dash, an oblique spot before the base of the cleft. The hindwings are grey‑brown.

References

pelospilus
Moths described in 1877
Moths of South America